Gilgameš (Serbian Cyrillic: Гилгамеш) is an opera in three acts by Rudolf Brucci. The libretto by Arsenije Arsa Milošević is based on the Mesopotamian Epic of Gilgamesh. It premiered on November 2, 1986 at the Serbian National Theatre in Novi Sad.

Roles
Gilgamesh, a Sumerian king – baritone
Enkidu, his friend and brother – tenor
Priestess at the temple of Ishtar – soprano
Rishat, Gilgamesh's mother – mezzo-soprano
Ishtar, Sumerian goddess of love and fertility – mezzo-soprano
Siduri Sabitu, guardian of entrance to the Garden of Gods – soprano
Aruru, Sumerian goddess of creation – soprano
Utnapishtim, Gilgamesh's ancestor – bass
Utnapishtim's wife – mezzo-soprano
Hunter / Ur-Shanabi / Utnapishtim's Sailor – tenor
First priest – tenor
Second priest – bass
Anu, sky god / Ea, god of water and wisdom / Shamash, Sun god – bass
Scorpion Man – male voice (speaking role)
Scorpion Woman – female voice (speaking role)
Humbaba, a demon – robot
Snake – dancerPeople of Uruk, Soldiers, Guard, Priests, Priestesses, virgins in service of Ishtar, dancersSee also
 Gilgamesh in the arts and popular culture
 Gilgamesh (disambiguation)#Operas

Sources

Basso, Alberto (1996). Musica in scena: storia dello spettacolo musicale, Volume 3, p. 457. UTET.  
Radović, Branka (2005). "Two orients in Rudolf Bruci's opera Gilgamesh". Muzikologija, Issue 5, pp. 153–165 (in Serbian with English summary)
Ziolkowski, Eric (September 2007). "An ancient newcomer to modern culture". World Literature Today''

External links
Libretto of Gilgamesh in Serbian at sr.wikibooks.org

Operas by Rudolf Brucci
Operas
Serbian-language operas
Works based on the Epic of Gilgamesh
1986 operas
Music based on poems
Operas based on literature